Richard Thomas Church CBE (26 March 1893 – 4 March 1972) was an English writer, poet and critic; he also wrote novels and verse plays, and three volumes of autobiography.

Early life
Church was born on 26 March 1893 in Battersea, in south-east London. He went to Dulwich Hamlet School in Dulwich. The second son of Thomas John Church and Lavina Annie Orton Church. His mother was distantly related to the novelist  George Eliot but kept quiet about this because of her bohemian lifestyle. His father was a sorter for the General Post Office and his mother was a schoolteacher who suffered ill-health and died in 1910 when he was only seventeen. After leaving school at sixteen, he started work as a clerk in the Customs and Excise branch of the Civil Service. In his first volume of autobiography he recounts the physicality of his father, the intelligence of his mother, his resourceful older brother, privations, and the difficult relationship of his ill-matched parents.

His first book of poems, The Flood of Life,  was published in 1917 when he was 24, but he remained in the Civil Service until 1933, when he left to write full-time at the age of 40.

Career
Church became a respected journalist and reviewer, and wrote extensively on country matters. His first poetry appeared in Robert Blatchford's Clarion, and he contributed verse to periodicals for the rest of his life.

His first post as a literary editor was with the New Leader, organ of the Independent Labour Party. He was director of the Oxford Festival of Spoken Poetry during the 1930s. His much-anthologised World War I poem "Mud" first appeared in Life and Letters, January 1935.

The first volume of Church's autobiography, Over the Bridge (1955), was awarded the Sunday Times Prize for Literature while the novelist Howard Spring described it as "the loveliest autobiography written in our time," pointing out that the writer had "found life full of enchantment, and how not the least of its enchantments was its challenge." The second volume, The Golden Sovereign, appeared in 1957. That year Church was named a Commander of the Order of the British Empire by Queen Elizabeth II.

Mystical experience
While young, Church had a mystical experience at a convalescent home, which he recounted in his autobiography, Over the Bridge, and which was also recounted by the British occultist writer Colin Wilson. Looking out of some French windows, Church saw a gardener chopping down a dead tree. What struck Church after a while was that the sight of the axe hitting the tree and the sound of the axe hitting the tree were not synchronised. The sound was delayed. At first he did not believe his own powers of perception, but after concentrating his vision and hearing, he came to the conclusion that he was experiencing an error in the laws of physics. He came to the conclusion – which would remain with him for the rest of his life – that "time and space are not absolute. Their power was not law."  He experienced an incredible freedom in this epiphany. "(...) I was free. Since time and space were deceivers, openly contradicting each other, and at best offering a compromise in place of law" 
 
After this epiphany another soon followed. From where he stood he sensed that "(...) my limbs and trunk were lighter than they seemed, and that I had only to reduce them by an act of will, perhaps by a mere change of physical mechanics, to command them off the ground, out of the tyranny of gravitation". He then left the ground and glided "about the room" some twelve or eighteen inches above the floor. He returned to the ground only to take off once more.

Personal life
Church married three times: firstly to  Caroline Parfett in 1915, with whom he had three daughters,  this marriage ending in divorce. He married his second wife, Catherina Schimmer on 19 November 1930, and the couple had a son before her death in 1965. He married his third wife, Dorothy Beale, a widow, on 25 February 1967.

He had a great love for the Kent countryside and this is reflected in much of his writing. He published an anthology of works on Kent.

Death
He and Dorothy initially lived at The Old Stable, they subsequently moved to The Priest's House at Sissinghurst Castle in Cranbrook where he died suddenly, aged 78, on 4 March 1972.

Works

Poetry collections
The Flood of Life (1917)
Hurricane (1919)
Philip (1923)
The Portrait of the Abbot (1926)
The Dream (1927)
Theme with Variations (1928) 
Mood without Measure (1928) 
Mary Shelley (1928)
The Glance Backward (1930) 
News from the Mountain (1932) 
Apple of Concord (1935)
Twelve Noon (1936) 
The Solitary Man (1941) 
Twentieth-Century Psalter (1943)
The Lamp (1946) 
Collected Poems (1948)
Selected Lyrical Poems (1951)
The Inheritors (1957) 
North of Rome (1960) 
The Burning Bush (1967)

Novels
Oliver’s Daughter (1930)
High Summer (1931)
The Prodigal Father (1933)
The Porch (1937)
The Stronghold (1939)
The Sampler (1942)
The Cave (1951) AKA Five Boys in a Cave.
Dog Toby. A Frontier Tale (1953)
 The dangerous years (1956)
 The Nightingale (1958)
The Crab-Apple Tree (1959)
Prince Albert (1963)
The Room Within (1940)
The White Doe (1968)
Little Miss Moffatt: a confession (1969)
The French lieutenant: a ghost story (1971)

Autobiography
Over the Bridge (1955)
The Golden Sovereign (1957)
The Voyage Home (1964)

Other books
Calling for a Spade (1939) Essays on country themes.
 Plato's Mistake (1941)
 , essays on contemporary writers
A squirrel called Rufus (1941) For children.
 Green Tide (1945) Essays, mainly on country themes.
 British authors : a twentieth-century gallery with 53 portraits (1948)
A window on a hill [1951]. Essays, mainly on country themes
Books and Writers (Robert Lynd) Foreword by Richard Church (1952)
The prodigal: a play in verse (1953)
 Down River (1957) For children.
 A country window; a round of essays (1958)
 Small moments. Decorated with wood-engravings by Joan Hassall (1957) Essays.
 The bells of Rye. Front. by Michael Hubbard (1960) For children.
 Calm October, essays (1961)
 The growth of the English novel (1961)
 A stroll before dark : essays (1965)
 The royal parks of London. With drawings by Victor Cooley (1965)
 Portrait of Canterbury (1968)
 Speaking aloud (1968)
 The wonder of words (1970)
A harvest of mushrooms: and other sporadic essays (1970)

Notes

External links 

 Richard Church Papers at the John Rylands Library
 Richard Church Collection at the Harry Ransom Center
 Richard Church bibliography

People from Dulwich
1893 births
1972 deaths
English male poets
20th-century English poets
20th-century English male writers
English World War I poets
Presidents of the English Centre of PEN